Four Decades is a live album by Eddie Jobson, celebrating the 40th anniversary of his recording career. The album was recorded during one single night in Kawasaki, Japan.

The set list is made up by songs from his solo albums and by the artists he has performed with during the course of his career, such as Curved Air, Roxy Music, Frank Zappa, U.K., Bruford and UKZ, thus only excluding his period with Jethro Tull in 1980. Sonja Kristina from Curved Air, John Wetton from UK and Aaron Lippert from UKZ make guest appearances for the material they originally performed on, with the latter also taking vocal duties for two other songs.

The album was released as a double CD, DVD and Blu-ray and in a special package together with UK's "Curtain Call".

Track listing

Personnel
Eddie Jobson - keyboards, electric violin, vocals (CD 2 2)
Alex Machacek - guitar
Ric Fierabracci - bass
Marco Minnemann - drums, acoustic guitar

Guest musicians
Sonja Kristina - vocals, acoustic guitar (CD1 2-6, CD2 12)
John Wetton - vocals, bass (CD1 9-13, CD 2 13)
Aaron Lippert - vocals (CD 1 6, CD2 3, 8-9, 13)

External links 
 Official Eddie Jobson website
 Official Jobson subscription fanclub

2015 live albums
Eddie Jobson albums